Sarakhs County is in Razavi Khorasan province, Iran. The capital of the county is the city of Sarakhs. At the 2006 census, the county's population was 85,524 in 19,485 households. The following census in 2011 counted 89,956 people in 23,438 households. At the 2016 census, the county's population was 97,519 in 26,932 households.

Administrative divisions

The population history of Sarakhs County's administrative divisions over three consecutive censuses is shown in the following table. The latest census shows two districts, six rural districts, and two cities.

References

 

Counties of Razavi Khorasan Province